Persatuan Sepakbola Indonesia Tanjung Jabung Barat, commonly known as Persitaj Tanjabbar, or Persitaj, is an Indonesian football club based in Kuala Tungkal, West Tanjung Jabung Regency, Jambi. They are competing in Liga 3 and their homeground is Persitaj Stadium.

References

Football clubs in Indonesia
Football clubs in Jambi